Richard C. Franklin is a sound editor. He was nominated at the 63rd Academy Awards for Best Sound Editing for the film Flatliners. The nomination was shared with Charles L. Campbell.

He has done over 90 films to date, including E.T. the Extra-Terrestrial.

References

External links

Sound editors
Living people
Date of birth missing (living people)
Year of birth missing (living people)